Pediatric stroke is a stroke that happens in children or adolescents.  Stroke affects about 6 in 100,000 children.

Pediatric stroke causes can and does happen at any age. Stroke is different in children and newborns than it is in adults. Children have hemorrhagic strokes as often as they have ischemic strokes, while adults are more likely to have ischemic strokes. Sixty percent of pediatric strokes occur in boys. Causes of stroke are also different in children than they are in adults.

Types of Strokes

Ischemic

In an ischemic stroke, blood supply to part of the brain is decreased, leading to dysfunction of the brain tissue in that area. There are four reasons why this might happen:

 Thrombosis (obstruction of a blood vessel by a blood clot forming locally)
 Embolism (obstruction due to an embolus from elsewhere in the body, see below),
 Systemic hypoperfusion (general decrease in blood supply, e.g., in shock)
 Venous thrombosis.

Stroke without an obvious explanation is termed "cryptogenic" (of unknown origin); this constitutes 30-40% of all ischemic strokes.

Hemorrhagic

Intracranial hemorrhage is the accumulation of blood anywhere within the skull vault. A distinction is made between intra-axial hemorrhage (blood inside the brain) and extra-axial hemorrhage (blood inside the skull but outside the brain). Intra-axial hemorrhage is due to intraparenchymal hemorrhage or intraventricular hemorrhage (blood in the ventricular system). The main types of extra-axial hemorrhage are epidural hematoma (bleeding between the dura mater and the skull), subdural hematoma (in the subdural space) and subarachnoid hemorrhage (between the arachnoid mater and pia mater). Most of the hemorrhagic stroke syndromes have specific symptoms (e.g., headache, previous head injury).

Symptoms and signs

Symptoms often include:

 Seizures, especially in newborns
 Keeping one hand in a fist position, especially in infants
 Worsening or sudden headaches
 Sudden difficulty speaking, slurring of words or trouble understanding speech
 Hemiparesis, or a weakness on one side of the body
 Sudden loss of vision or abnormal eye movements
 Sudden loss of balance or trouble walking

Prognosis 
The prognosis for pediatric stroke survivors varies.  The following are some common outcomes:
 Cerebral Palsy (often Hemiplegic Cerebral Palsy/Hemiplegia)
 Epilepsy
 Vision Loss
 Hearing Loss

Treatment of Pediatric Stroke 

 If symptoms of pediatric stroke seizure are seen, the infant should be taken to the hospital immediately for assessment, diagnosis, and treatment.
 Medications and other treatments may be recommended to help treat the symptoms (e.g. to control seizures) or correct the cause of the stroke, such as rehydration, antibiotics for meningitis, and, medication or surgery to correct heart abnormalities.

References 

Stroke
Pediatrics